Allan Taylor (born 30 September 1945 in Brighton, England) is an English singer-songwriter who has written and performed music around the world for over 50 years.

Career
Taylor left school in 1961. He was an apprentice in telecommunications until 1965. Inspired by skiffle and the beat generation, he started singing and playing guitar in the folk clubs of Brighton through his teenage years. He became a full-time musician in 1966, and left Brighton to become part of the music scene in London. He toured Great Britain, playing various folk clubs, including the Troubadour Club in London, sometimes supporting  Fairport Convention. In 1970 he signed a recording contract with United Artists, recording the albums  Sometimes (1971) and The Lady (1972).

Taylor moved to New York and became part of the singer-songwriter scene in Greenwich Village, playing at clubs such as Gerde's, The Gaslight Cafe, The Bitter End, the Mercer Arts Center, and The Bottom Line. He toured throughout America and recorded The American Album in Nashville and Los Angeles (1973). He signed to Island Records as a songwriter in 1974. In the mid-1970s, he returned to live in UK, and then formed the band Cajun Moon. He then signed a recording contract with Chrysalis Records and made one LP: Cajun Moon (1976). In 1976, he ended the band and became a solo artist. He made three records with Black Crow/Rubber Records from 1978 to 1983 (The Traveller, winner of the Grand Prix du Disque de Montreaux for best European Record, Roll on the Day, and Circle ‘Round Again). Taylor formed T Records in 1980 and made Win or Lose (1984), Lines (1988), Out of Time (1991), So Long (1993), Faded Light (1995), The Alex Campbell Tribute Concert (1997).

From 1980 to 1992 (whilst continuing as a singer-songwriter, recording/performing artist and working occasionally for the BBC presenting documentary programmes), he earned three academic degrees: a BA from Leeds University, a MA from Lancaster University, and a PhD in ethnomusicology from Queen's University Belfast.

1995–present
In 1995, he started his relationship with Stockfisch Records, based in Northeim, Germany, producing Looking for You (1996), Colour to the Moon (2000), Hotels and Dreamers 2003, Old Friends New Roads (2007), Leaving at Dawn (2009), Songs for the Road (2010), All Is One (2013), There was a Time (2015).

To date, there are more than 100 cover versions of his song "It's Good to See You" in ten different languages and numerous cover versions of his other songs, also in many different languages.

Taylor's song "Roll on the Day", developed from his personal experience of visiting with an ex-coal miner and witnessing the effects on him of a lifetime of working in a coal mine.

In The Oxford Book of Traditional Verse, Dr. Frederick Woods comments: "Allan Taylor is one of the more literate and sensitive of contemporary songwriters in terms of words and music, and one who is capable of exploring more complex subjects than most of his contemporaries… he should probably be regarded as potentially the most important songwriter of his generation."

So with a career that spans from 1966 to the present, Taylor has a significant degree of experience and maturity in his music.

Taylor continues to record and perform concerts throughout Europe. He currently resides in Leeds, England.

Discography 
 The Lady, 1971
 Sometimes, 1971
 The American Album, 1973 
 Cajun Moon, 1976 
 The Traveller, 1978 
 Roll on the Day, 1980 
 Circle Round Again, 1983 
 Win or Lose, 1984 
 Lines, 1988 
 Out of Time, 1991 
 So Long, 1993 
 Faded Light, 1995 
 Looking for You, 1996 
 Alex Campbell Tribute Concert, 1997 
 Colour to the Moon, 2000 
 Out of Time: Remastered, 2002 
 Banjoman: Derroll Adams Tribute, 2002 
 Hotels & Dreamers, 2003 
 Old Friends, New Roads, 2007 
 Leaving at Dawn, 2009 
 In the Groove, 2010 
 Songs for the Road, 2010 
 Down the Years I Travelled..., 2012 
 Old Friends in Concert (Live-CD with Hannes Wader, 2013
 All Is One, 2013 
 There Was a Time, 2016 
 Behind the Mix, 2017

References

External links
 Allan Taylor Biography

1945 births
Living people
Musicians from Brighton and Hove
Stockfisch Records artists
Chrysalis Records artists